Ficus cotinifolia, the alamo tree, is a species of flowering plant in the family Moraceae, native to seasonally dry tropical areas of Mexico and Central America. It often sends roots down to cenotes and other underground water sources.

References

cotinifolia
Flora of Mexico
Flora of Central America
Plants described in 1817